Franois is a commune in the Doubs department in the Bourgogne-Franche-Comté region in eastern France

Population

References

Communes of Doubs